
The Declaration of Independence of the Republic of Moldova was a document adopted on 27 August 1991 by the Parliament of the Republic of Moldova following the failure of the August coup attempt.

Background 
The document claims "millennial history" and "uninterrupted statehood" within historic and ethnic borders and refers to the official language as "Romanian". This founding act of the Republic of Moldova is celebrated as the National Day or Independence Day. 
 

The original document that was approved and signed by 278 parliamentary deputies in 1991 was burned during the April 2009 Moldovan parliamentary election protests, but an identical document was restored in 2010.

Controversy 
The Moldovan Declaration of Independence clearly and directly claims Moldovan sovereignty over the territory of Transnistria as "a component part of the historical and ethnic territory of our people". This caused controversy, since that region had declared independence from the Moldovan SSR in 1990 and formed the Pridnestrovian Moldavian Soviet Socialist Republic (PMSSR); however, the PMSSR had not been recognised as a legitimate Soviet republic by neither the Soviet Union nor the Moldovan SSR.

See also
 Independence Day (Republic of Moldova)
 Dissolution of the Soviet Union
 Disputed status of Transnistria
 Transnistrian Declaration of Independence

References

External links
 Declaration of Independence of the Republic of Moldova

Moldova
1991 documents
1991 in law
Political history of Moldova
Law of Moldova
1991 in Moldova
1991 in the Soviet Union
1991 in international relations
Moldavian Soviet Socialist Republic
Dissolution of the Soviet Union
August 1991 events in Europe